Baltasar Márquez (born 7 February 1967) is a Spanish rower. He competed in the men's coxed four event at the 1988 Summer Olympics.

References

External links
 

1967 births
Living people
Spanish male rowers
Olympic rowers of Spain
Rowers at the 1988 Summer Olympics
Place of birth missing (living people)